The Sound Lounge is a grassroots live music venue on Sutton High Street in Sutton, South London.  The venue hosts live performances including blues, Americana, folk and roots music. It incorporates a plant-based, carbon-neutral café and a vinyl record shop, and, in addition to music, also hosts visual art exhibitions, theatre and dance.

Locations, past and present
The venue's previous locations were first Tooting, then Wimbledon and then Morden before occupying the former premises of Sutton's Royal Bank of Scotland on Sutton High Street. Some activities continue at the Morden venue.

Activities

Following the easing of lockdown, the Sutton and Morden venues had a limited opening in April 2021 for outdoor food and drink consumption and, at the Sutton venue, vinyl record sales at the Union Music Store within. A women's theatre event took place in June 2021, and Sunday jazz afternoons with vegan roast are planned. In addition to its normal meal sales, the venue works in conjunction with Time Out Youth Project at the Sutton Life Centre to provide free meals for young people with food insecurity.

Plans for the future include the installation of a community garden, free hot drinks for local residents suffering from social isolation, and activities for pre-school children.  They also plan to provide training for disadvantaged people aiming to become baristas and sound engineers.

Carbon neutrality certification
On 1 July 2021 the venue became the country's first grassroots music venue to be certified as carbon neutral by the CarbonNeutral company. A wide variety of measures have been put in place to achieve neutrality.  In addition to the fully plant-based menu for the café, the venue also obtains all of its energy from renewable sources, sends no waste to landfill and maintains an allotment garden on site for zero-carbon produce for the café.

Time & Leisure Magazine awards
In January 2022, The Sound Lounge gained several Time & Leisure Magazine annual food And culture awards.  Its main award was being named "Food Hero of the Year", with its environmentally friendly ethos earning particular approval from those voting in the awards. In addition, it came first under the "best coffee house/teahouse" category; it was highly commended within the "LoveSuttonBiz" award sponsored by Enjoy Sutton; and it was commended under the "Favourite Entertainment Venue" category. The owners, Keiron Marshall and Hannah White, said: "We are blown away to have been shortlisted in so many categories both as a cafe/restaurant and as an arts & culture space, particularly when there are so many incredible businesses across the region who deserve recognition; and particularly after such a tough year! Sincere thanks to Time & Leisure Magazine and its readers."

References

External links

Music venues in London
Morden
Sutton, London
Tourist attractions in the London Borough of Sutton
Shops in London
Vegan restaurants